Rubiera is a comune (municipality) in the Province of Reggio Emilia in the Italian region Emilia-Romagna, located on the Via Emilia about  northwest of Bologna and about  southeast of Reggio Emilia.

History
The original name of the city was Corte de Herberia, probably derived from the Celtic , meaning "in the middle of the plain". The Roman emperors Gallienus and Valerianus built a bridge over the Secchia river at this location in AD 259.

The first historical mention of Rubiera is from 915, at which time it was a fief of the Supponidi family; the city later became a fief of the Obertenghi family. At later times it was a possession of the House of Este, a Papal possession, and part of the Duchy of Modena and Reggio, during which period the castle was used as a prison.

Among the churches in the community are:
Santissima Annunziata (18th century)
Santi Faustino e Giovita (10th century)
Sant'Agata a Casale (16th century)
Parish church (18th century)

Sports
Rubiera is the hometown of Stefano Baldini, European and Olympic marathon champion. Rubiera's handball team (Pallamano Secchia) has played in the Italian serie A every year since 1982.

Twin towns
 Bjelovar, Croatia
 Neulingen, Germany, since 1991
 Györújbarát, Hungary, since 2005

References

External links
 Official website

Cities and towns in Emilia-Romagna